Rufus William Harp (November 28, 1923 – March 16, 1994) was an American set decorator. He won three Primetime Emmy Awards and was nominated for fourteen more in the category Outstanding Art Direction for his work on the television programs My Name Is Barbra, The Carol Burnett Show, Studs Lonigan, Casablanca, Moonlighting and the television films Marilyn: The Untold Story and Invitation to Hell. Harp died in March 1994 of a heart attack in Hollywood, California, at the age of 70.

References

External links 

1923 births
1994 deaths
People from Bastrop, Louisiana
American set decorators
Primetime Emmy Award winners
Louisiana State University alumni